David Tengizovich Ozmanov (born 31 January 1995) is a Russian football player. He plays for Sokol Saratov.

Club career
He made his debut in the Russian Football National League for FC SKA-Energiya Khabarovsk on 25 April 2016 in a game against FC Gazovik Orenburg.

References

External links
 Profile by Russian Football National League

1995 births
Sportspeople from Saratov
Living people
Russian footballers
Association football defenders
FC Mordovia Saransk players
FC SKA-Khabarovsk players
FC Sokol Saratov players
Russian First League players
Russian Second League players